Kristaq Eksarko (born 12 November 1959) is an Albanian footballer. He played in four matches for the Albania national football team from 1983 to 1984.

References

External links
 

1959 births
Living people
Albanian footballers
Albania international footballers
Place of birth missing (living people)
Association football midfielders
FK Partizani Tirana players